Sandved may refer to:

Places
 Sandved, Denmark, a village in Naestved Municipality in Region Zealand, Denmark 
 Sandved, Norway, a borough in the city of Sandnes in Rogaland county, Norway
 Mount Sandved, a mountain in the Queen Elizabeth Range in Antarctica

People
 David Sandved (1912–2001), Norwegian architect
 Kjell Bloch Sandved (1922–2015), Norwegian-born American author, lecturer, and nature photographer

See also
 Sandve, a Norwegian village that is pronounced similarly to Sandved